Əliabad may refer to:
Əliabad, Bilasuvar, Azerbaijan
Əliabad, Jalilabad, Azerbaijan
Əliabad, Lerik (disambiguation)
Əliabad (38° 41' N 48° 33' E), Lerik, Azerbaijan
Əliabad (38° 50' N 48° 37' E), Lerik, Azerbaijan
Əliabad, Nakhchivan, Azerbaijan
Əliabad, Saatly, Azerbaijan
Əliabad, Zaqatala, Azerbaijan

See also
Aliabad, Azerbaijan (disambiguation)